

The TKB-506 was a small handgun designed to look like a cigar cutter, developed by Igor Stechkin, allegedly on the orders of the KGB.

The dimensions of TKB-506 are 11 x 9.2 x 2 cm. Weighing 0.44 kg empty, it could fire three 7.62 mm rounds, each held in a separate barrel only 2.5 cm long and each having a separate striker. Device number 10 can now be seen at the Tula arms museum.

TKB-506A had an identical armament, and similar weight of around 0.47 kg with ammo, but was even smaller (7.4 cm height) by doing away with the cut-through hole used for the trigger in TKB-506.

See also
 List of Russian weaponry
 Nazi belt buckle pistol
 NRS-2
 S4M

References

External links 
 Photographs

Cold War firearms of the Soviet Union
KGB
Multiple-barrel firearms
Pistols
Tula Arms Plant products